Manne Srinivas Reddy is an Indian politician. He was elected to the Lok Sabha, lower house of the Parliament of India from Mahbubnagar, Telangana in the 2019 Indian general election as member of the Telangana Rashtra Samithi.

References

External links
 Official biographical sketch in Parliament of India website

India MPs 2019–present
Lok Sabha members from Telangana
Living people
People from Mahbubnagar
1959 births